Joan Samson (Pennsylvania, 1937- Cambridge, 1976) was a US writer. Her only published novel was The Auctioneer, published briefly before she died of brain cancer.

"The Auctioneer", published in 1976 is described as a story that borders on horror, a story about how a community is torn apart by a single person. It has been translated to Spanish, Dutch, Italian and recently to Catalan and Polish. It is considered one of the best-selling horror novels of the 1970s, selling over a million copies.

Works 

 Watching the New Baby (1974)
 The Auctioneer (New York: Simon and Schuster), 1976

References 

Writers from Pennsylvania
American women novelists
1937 births
1976 deaths